Chatānmari is a Nepalese rice crepe, which is a part of Newa cuisine of the Kathmandu Valley in Nepal. It is generally eaten during festivals and other special occasions.

Chatānmari is now widely eaten as a snack and has become popular among other cultures, too. Many restaurants in Kathmandu serve chatānmari as an appetizer. There are small eateries that serve chatānmari as the main item on their menu.

Ingredients
 Rice flour batter
 1 cup rice flour
 1/6 teaspoon salt

Topping 
 150 gram ground turkey or pork or mixture of both
 ¼ cup chopped onion
 ¼ cup green peas
 1 tablespoon diced tomato
 1 teaspoon diced hot green pepper
 1 teaspoon garlic
 ½ teaspoon ginger
 1 tablespoon oil
 Salt to taste

Alternative toppings
Eggs
Cheese
Ricotta cheese and sugar
Sugar

Procedure
	
The rice flour is mixed with water (a little bit thinner than cake paste). The lentil paste is mixed with rice flour if you are looking for different flavor.

Topping
Everything is mixed well.

Cooking
The flat pan should be heated to medium. The batter is poured on the hot pan and spread as thin as possible with the ladle used to pour it.

The topping is put on the batter and the pan is covered with a lid until the topping is cooked.

Cooking utensils
ladle
 damp cloth
 flat pan with lid

See also
 List of pancakes

External links
http://www.food-nepal.com/recipe/R055.htm
http://www.cookbookwiki.com/Stuffed_Chatamari
https://web.archive.org/web/20070928074215/http://presen.schoolnet.or.jp/summer2006/web/46/h-f.html

Newari cuisine
Pancakes